This is a list of films that portray the destruction or vandalism of art and cultural heritage in museums and other settings.

Art crime
Lists of films by common content